The position of Prime Minister of Turkey was established in 1920, during the Turkish War of Independence. The prime minister was the head of the executive branch of the government along with the Cabinet. Following the 2017 constitutional referendum, the office of prime minister was abolished and the President became the head of the executive branch after the 2018 general election. 

For a list of grand viziers of the predecessor Ottoman Empire, see List of Ottoman grand viziers.

List of prime ministers (1920–2018)

Heads of the Government of the Grand National Assembly (1920–1923)

Prime Ministers of the Republic of Turkey (1923–2018)
Status

Notes

Timeline

See also
Prime Minister of Turkey
List of prime ministers of Turkey by time in office
President of Turkey
List of presidents of Turkey
Vice President of Turkey
Coalition governments in Turkey
List of cabinets of Turkey

List
Lists of prime ministers of Turkey
Prime Ministers
Prime Ministers
Turkey